Willard Goldsmith Rouse (April 14, 1867 – July 31, 1930) was an American attorney, businessman, and father of land developer James Rouse.

Youth, education, early career 
Rouse was born in Creswell, Maryland, the son of Harriet Bayliss (Hanway) and John Goldsmith Rouse. He was a lawyer trained at Johns Hopkins University who once ran as the state's attorney for Harford County, Maryland. When he lost, the Rouse family moved from Bel Air, Maryland to Easton, Maryland. Rouse died due to cancer of the bladder and his wife to heart failure, and lost his home on Brooklett's Avenue to bank foreclosure.

Personal life
Rouse is the great-grandfather of actor Edward Norton.

Rouse's other son, Willard Rouse II, and grandson, Willard Rouse III, were also notable real estate developers.

References

1867 births
1930 deaths
People from Easton, Maryland
Johns Hopkins University alumni
Deaths from bladder cancer
Businesspeople from Maryland
State's attorneys in Maryland
Deaths from cancer in Maryland
Rouse family